Rahmane is both a given name and surname. Notable people with the name include:

 Aboubakar Abdel Rahmane (died 1979), Chadian warlord
 Rahmane Barry (born 1986), Senegalese footballer

See also
 Rahman (name)